MBF may refer to:
 MBF, an Australian health insurance provider now merged with Bupa
 Marine's Best Friend, a Doom source port based on Boom
 One thousand board feet, a measurement in common use in the North American lumber industry 
 Microsoft Binary Format, a floating point number format
 MBF Bioscience, a bioscience research software development company
 Minimum breaking force, a measurement for ropestrengths in kilonewtons (kN)
 Master of Banking and Finance
 Militärbefehlshaber in Frankreich (English: German Military Command in France), which administered Occupied France during World War II